An annular solar eclipse occurred at the Moon's descending node of the orbit on Thursday, April 29, 1976. A solar eclipse occurs when the Moon passes between Earth and the Sun, thereby totally or partly obscuring the image of the Sun for a viewer on Earth. An annular solar eclipse occurs when the Moon's apparent diameter is smaller than the Sun's, blocking most of the Sun's light and causing the Sun to look like an annulus (ring). An annular eclipse appears as a partial eclipse over a region of the Earth thousands of kilometres wide.
Annularity was visible from North Africa, Greece, Turkey, Middle East, central Asia, India, China. 5 of the 14 eight-thousanders in Pakistan and China—Nanga Parbat, K2, Broad Peak, Gasherbrum II and Gasherbrum I, lie in the path of annularity.

Observation 
Results showed that the gravitational acceleration had no obvious effect within the accuracy of the instruments. No inclination was recorded on the photosensitive paper of the inclinometer due to the width of its lines. Three inclinations were pen-recorded, whose time and direction were clearly related to that of the eclipse. Due to the difficult conditions with the high altitude, the observation team was unable to obtain more comparative data.

Related eclipses

Eclipses in 1976 
 An annular solar eclipse on Thursday, 29 April 1976.
 A partial lunar eclipse on Thursday, 13 May 1976.
 A total solar eclipse on Saturday, 23 October 1976.
 A penumbral lunar eclipse on Saturday, 6 November 1976.

Solar eclipses of 1975–1978

Saros 128

Metonic series

Notes

References

 Solar eclipse of April 29, 1976 in Russia 

1976 4 29
1976 in science
1976 4 29
April 1976 events